Ryan Thomas McAllister (born 1976/1977) is an American lawyer who is a former nominee to be a United States district judge of the United States District Court for the Northern District of New York.

Education 

McAllister earned his Bachelor of Arts, summa cum laude, from Catholic University of America in 1999 and his Juris Doctor, cum laude, from the Harvard Law School in 2002.

Legal career 

Upon graduating law school, McAllister served as a law clerk to Judge Richard C. Wesley of the United States Court of Appeals for the Second Circuit. He served as Assistant Counsel to then-New York Governor  George E. Pataki from 2004 to 2006.  After Pataki left office in 2006, McAllister joined the law firm of Boies Schiller Flexner, LLP as an associate in their Albany, New York office.  From 2011 to 2016, he was Senior Counsel in the New York State Senate Office of Majority Counsel & Program.  From 2013 to 2016, he was a solo practitioner in Cobleskill.  He was then District Director for Congressman John Faso from 2016 to 2019. In 2019, he returned to  Boies Schiller Flexner, LLP in their Albany, New York office as Counsel.

Expired nomination to district court 

On August 12, 2020, President Trump announced his intent to nominate McAllister to serve as a United States district judge for the United States District Court for the Northern District of New York. On September 8, 2020, his nomination was sent to the Senate. President Trump nominated McAllister to the seat vacated by Judge Gary L. Sharpe who took senior status on January 1, 2016. On January 3, 2021, his nomination was returned to the President under Rule XXXI, Paragraph 6 of the United States Senate.

Schoharie County Judge 

In 2022, McAllister was elected as Schoharie County Judge.

References

1970s births
Living people
Year of birth missing (living people)
Place of birth missing (living people)
21st-century American lawyers
Catholic University of America alumni
Harvard Law School alumni
New York (state) lawyers
New York (state) Republicans
Boies Schiller Flexner people